Chupinguaia is a municipality located in the Brazilian state of Rondônia. Its population was 11,472 (2020) and its area is 5,127 km².

References

Municipalities in Rondônia